Antonio Carlos Vieira (born February 7, 1956) is a former Brazilian football player and manager.

References

External links
Antonio Carlos Vieira profile
Real Maryland article
Viera the future is bright for Timor Leste

Living people
1956 births
Brazilian footballers
Oriente Petrolero players
Club Deportivo Palestino footballers
Expatriate footballers in Chile
Expatriate footballers in Bolivia
Brazilian football managers
Expatriate football managers in El Salvador
Estudiantes de Mérida managers
C.D. Águila managers
Municipal Limeño managers
Expatriate football managers in Belize
Panama national football team managers
Belize national football team managers
Expatriate football managers in East Timor
Timor-Leste national football team managers
Association footballers not categorized by position
People from Arapongas
Brazilian expatriate football managers
Brazilian expatriate sportspeople in Belize
Brazilian expatriate sportspeople in East Timor
Brazilian expatriate sportspeople in El Salvador
Brazilian expatriate sportspeople in Chile
Sportspeople from Paraná (state)